Guillermo García López and Henri Kontinen were the defending champions, but chose not to participate this year.

Jean-Julien Rojer and Horia Tecău won the title, defeating Julio Peralta and Horacio Zeballos in the final, 6–3, 6–4.

Seeds

Draw

Draw

References
 Main Draw

Winston-Salem Open - Doubles
2017 Doubles